Alberta Provincial Highway No. 64 is an east-west highway in northern Alberta, Canada.  In the west, Highway 64 begins at the Alberta/British Columbia border and ends at Highway 2 southwest of the Town of Fairview.

Major intersections

Highway 64A 

Alberta Provincial Highway No. 64A is the designation of an alternate route off Highway 64 serving the Town of Fairview. It extends  from its intersection with Highway 64/Highway 682 in the west to its intersection with Highway 2/Highway 732 within Fairview in the east.

Major intersections

References 

064